Giannis Dermitzakis (born 5 November 1992) is a Greek professional footballer who plays as a goalkeeper.

References

1992 births
Living people
Super League Greece players
Football League (Greece) players
Ergotelis F.C. players
OFI Crete F.C. players
Association football goalkeepers
Footballers from Heraklion
Greek footballers